The valuation of nonmarket housework comprises attempts to attach value to non-exchange domestic tasks. Housework may include a variety of activities, particularly those traditionally associated with housekeeping (or homemaking), along with child care and nurturing. These activities have recognizable economic and social significance, but are not included in standard economic measurements, such as the gross domestic product (GDP). While the symbolic or subjective benefits of housework are difficult to measure, various attempts have been made to attach value to economically productive household activity.

Economic valuation

Tracking measures

Traditional means of tracking economic activity, such as the gross domestic product (GDP), do not take account of non-exchange, nonmarket household activity. Therefore, various adjustments to GDP calculations and novel measurements have been proposed, such as the GPI or GHP.

Gross domestic product (GDP)

In 2012, the US Department of Commerce Bureau of Economic Analysis (BEA) created an adjusted measure of GDP to account for productive household activity.  By using detailed time use surveys for the period 1965-2010, the BEA found that incorporating “nonmarket household production” raises the GDP measure by 39% in 1965 and 26% in 2010.  The surveys used seven categories of time use in American household production (housework, cooking, odd jobs, gardening, shopping, child care, and domestic travel) and the BEA assigned a low-end market wage to the hours spent on each activity.

The declining impact on the adjusted GDP reflects the steadily decreasing number of (nonmarket) hours households spent on home production. While men increased their weekly hours of home production in the time span from 14 to 17, this increase was more than offset by the decline in women's home production from 40 to 26 hours.  The BEA explains this shift by increased women's participation in the work force as well as the steadily decreasing market wages of household workers (such as cleaners and nannies), raising the opportunity costs of self-participation and encouraging outsourcing.

Genuine progress indicator (GPI)

The GPI is an alternative to GDP as a measure of economic growth that is generally designed to incorporate environmental and social factors that are not traditionally included. While much of the focus is typically placed on environmental costs, most GPI measurements explicitly include additions for the value of household work and parenting.

One of the most well-known examples is the GPI measure used across Atlantic Canada. In a 1999 report   GPI Atlantic describes the household production infrastructure as akin to the access to raw materials, labour and markets required for the business sector. The Atlantic GPI employs time use variables and assigns explicit monetary values to unpaid work according to its replacement value in the market. According to their (1999) measurements, “unpaid work contributes $325 billion worth of services to the Canadian economy annually” and they argue that GPI analysis should be explicitly incorporated into policy considerations.

Gross household product (GHP)

Gross household product is a specific estimation of the economic value added by the unpaid work and capital of households. It does not include many of the additional factors typically included in GPI determinations but focuses specifically on the “household economy.” Duncan Ironmonger defines a country's Gross Economic Product as comprising both the Gross Market Product (typically defined as GDP) and Gross Household Product. Using one of the same time use surveys as the BEA study referenced above (the American Time Use Survey), Ironmonger estimates the USA's 2011 GHP at 11.6 trillion dollars (as compared to a GDP of 13.3 trillion).

Approaches to the Economic Valuation of Housework

The OECD report Cooking, Caring and Volunteering: Unpaid Work Around the World defines unpaid work as, “the production of goods and services by household members that are not sold on the market” .  It uses the “third-person” rule   to distinguish between work and leisure, claiming that if a third person can be paid to do the activity while benefiting the household, it is work.

While paid work outside of the home is readily measurable, housework is much more difficult to calculate. A number of models have been created to determine the value of work in the home, each with different conceptualizations of the process. There is currently no consensus on the appropriate approach.

These methods are generally divided into two main camps: the opportunity cost approach and the market value approach. The former views housework as equivalent to the amount one would make in the labour market. Housework is therefore evaluated at the wage rate that the member would otherwise have received. The market value approach bases the value of work done in the home on the cost of hiring someone to do the same job. Neither method is without criticism.

The opportunity cost method is flawed in that it is difficult to pinpoint a comparator group. Not all workers have their choice of job, nor the number of hours they work. Furthermore, wages vary depending on the location of the job and the gender of the employee, and the time it takes to get to and from work is not factored into the calculation. Age, level of education, and work experience are good predictors of what one would make in the labour market, but they are simply a subset of the aspects that can be used to calculate what a house worker would make. Therefore, while many studies regarding the valuation of work in the home have attempted to come up with a standard wage and multiply it by the number of hours worked, there is no agreement as to how this standard wage should be determined.

The market value approach comes with its own set of flaws. One type of approach within this category is the Direct Output Method, which is based on the value of production rather than the hours of labour performed in the household.  It solves the problem of having to come up with a standard wage, but it is inherently difficult to obtain data on production output (e.g., number of pants folded) in the home. Furthermore, comparing the value of individual tasks performed to the average market price it would cost to get that same task completed may not be accurate, as multiple tasks can and are often done simultaneously in the home. To counteract this problem, one can construct a valuation based on the total wages of a housekeeper who performs a similar set of tasks. Yet, even then, the model does not take into account that men and women in the labour market often do housework, but hire housekeepers to do specific jobs that may require particular skills or expertise and demand a higher wage as a result.

Overall, while these methods have attempted to create ways to determine the value of household labour, there is no accepted approach.

Gender disparity

Despite women's increased participation in the work force, several North American studies show that women still engage in significantly more housework activity than men.

A recent study by Statistics Canada indicates that while men and women participate (nearly) equally in the labour force, women spend far more hours on unpaid housework, such as child care and domestic work (including house cleaning, cooking, yard work and home maintenance).  For example, it was found that men spend an average of 24.4 hours per week on child care, while women spend 50.1 hours on the same tasks. In the domestic work category, men conduct 8.3 hours of unpaid work, compared with 13.8 hours per week for women.

According to GPI Atlantic, “[t]ime use surveys reveal that Canadian women spend about twice as much time on total unpaid household work, including child and elder care, as men. They spend three times as long cooking and washing dishes, and nearly seven times as much time cleaning house and doing laundry”. This is despite a doubling of the female labour force from 1960-1999.  The report argues that due to the invisibility of unpaid household production in traditional economic measures (like GDP), women are subject to wage and gender discrimination that has significant adverse effects on their economic well-being.

By contrast, the US Department of Commerce Bureau of Economic Analysis found a smaller discrepancy between genders on productive (but nonmarket) housework. According to their May 2012 report, women spend approximately 26 hours per week on home production, as opposed to 17 hours for men. Note, however, that the tasks included vary significantly between studies.

References

Home economics